The Blackburn Point Bridge is a historic swing bridge located near Osprey, Florida, United States, that is listed on the U.S. National Register of Historic Places.  It is a one-lane swing bridge located on Blackburn Point Road at the Gulf Intracoastal Waterway. It is the northernmost of the two bridges connecting the barrier island Casey Key to the mainland of Florida.

History
The bridge was constructed by the Champion Bridge Company and opened to traffic in December 1926. It contains port and starboard signals along the north truss of the bridge.

The bridge was added to the National Register on March 29, 2001.

References

External links

 Sarasota County listings at nationalregisterofhistoricplaces.com (non-government) website
 Blackburn Point Bridge at Florida's Office of Cultural and Historical Programs
 Aerial photo of bridge

Road bridges on the National Register of Historic Places in Florida
Swing bridges in the United States
National Register of Historic Places in Sarasota County, Florida
Bridges completed in 1926
1926 establishments in Florida
Drawbridges on the National Register of Historic Places
Transportation buildings and structures in Sarasota County, Florida